Konstantinos Kallias (July 9, 1901 – April 7, 2004) was a Greek politician.

He was born in Chalkis. He co-founded with Panagiotis Kanellopoulos the National Unionist Party. He served in many ministerial positions, including Minister for Justice (1958) and vice-president of New Democracy under Konstantinos Karamanlis (1975–1976).

In the first Greek elections to the European Parliament, he was elected as a Member of the European Parliament (MEP). In 2003 he entered the Guinness Book of Records as the oldest active writer of an autobiography, at the age of 102. He died, aged 102, in Athens on April 7, 2004.

1901 births
2004 deaths
People from Chalcis
National Unionist Party (Greece) politicians
National Reconstruction Front (Greece) politicians
Greek Rally politicians
National Radical Union politicians
Justice ministers of Greece
Greek MPs 1950–1951
Greek MPs 1951–1952
Greek MPs 1952–1956
Greek MPs 1956–1958
New Democracy (Greece) MEPs
MEPs for Greece 1981–1984
Greek centenarians
Men centenarians